Kampochloa is a genus of African plants in the grass family. The only known species is Kampochloa brachyphylla, native to Zambia and Angola.

References

Chloridoideae
Grasses of Africa
Flora of Angola
Flora of Zambia
Monotypic Poaceae genera